Jacqueline María Aguilera Marcano (born 17 November 1976 in Valencia, Carabobo) is a Venezuelan model and beauty queen who became the fifth woman from Venezuela to capture the Miss World crown. Former Miss World 1994 Aishwarya Rai handed over her crown to Aguilera after her reign as the Miss World for a year.

Top Model of the World
She participated in Top Model of the World 1995, held in Moscow, Russia, where she became Venezuela's first titleholder in history.

Miss World Venezuela
Aguilera competed in 1995 as Miss Nueva Esparta in her country's national beauty pageant, obtaining the title of Miss World Venezuela and the right to represent her country in Miss World 1995.

Miss World 1995
At the Miss World Pageant on 18 November 1995 in Sun City, South Africa, she won the crown as the 45th Miss World, as well as the Photogenic award.

Personal life
Presently, she operates a modeling agency in Venezuela and lives in Margarita Island, Venezuela.

References

External links
 Miss Venezuela

1976 births
Living people
People from Valencia, Venezuela
Miss Venezuela World winners
Miss World winners
Miss World 1995 delegates
Top Model of the World winners
Venezuelan beauty pageant winners